Gordon Fraser (born 27 November 1943) is a Scottish former professional footballer.  A product of the Scottish Highland Football League, Fraser played as a centre forward in the English Football League for Cardiff City, Millwall, and Newport County.  He also played in the Scottish Highland Football League with Forres Mechanics FC, his first senior club, and subsequently with Elgin City on his return from Millwall.

References

External links

1943 births
Living people
Scottish footballers
Association football forwards
Cardiff City F.C. players
Barry Town United F.C. players
Elgin City F.C. players
Millwall F.C. players
Newport County A.F.C. players
Weymouth F.C. players
English Football League players
Forres Mechanics F.C. players